Kogi Korean BBQ is a fleet of five fusion food trucks in Los Angeles famous both for their combination of Korean with Mexican food and also for their reliance on Internet technology, especially Twitter and YouTube, to spread information about their offerings and locations. Highlights of typical fare include Spicy Pork Tacos, Kimchi Quesadillas and Short Rib Sliders. Its owner/founder, Mark Manguera, a Filipino-American, married into a Korean family and was inspired to combine Mexican and Korean food as a result. The food truck has won much recognition, including a Bon Appétit Award in 2009 and "Best New Chef" for Roy Choi by Food & Wine in 2010, the first for a food truck.

Early days 
The Kogi truck took a while to catch on. After several weeks of parking in different locations and not getting any customers, Kogi began going to clubs and giving free samples to bouncers. They enjoyed them and spread the word.

Kogi's first "big break" came when it got the idea outside of Green Door in Hollywood to contact food bloggers about trying the tacos who then wrote about Kogi. Its subsequent use of Twitter to announce its location led to considerable buzz on social networking services, leading Newsweek to proclaim Kogi "America's first viral eatery".

Operations 
In addition to co-founders Mark Manguera and Caroline Shin, Mark Manguera's friend Roy Choi, a former valedictorian at the Culinary Institute of America, is the chief chef and considered "a sort of post-Abstract Expressionist food artist" while Manguera's sister-in-law, Alice Shin, is in charge of connectivity- posting and tweeting regularly to keep their roving clientele informed. The name, logo, decision to use Twitter, and ongoing social media strategy came from consultant and "twentysomething social networking and branding wunderkind" Kogi Social Media & Brand Director Mike Prasad, who is a best friend of Eric Shin, Kogi Lunch Manager, photographer, and brother of Caroline.

Kogi initially had no fixed location. In the tradition of LA taco trucks, Kogi operated entirely from a mobile vehicle driven around the city and parked for a few hours in different locations, with some preparation done from a home base in Culver City, California. Its fan base has been built up through effective use of the Internet and cell phones to promote an online "Kogi Kulture". By mid-2009 it had 36,000 Twitter followers, and its first fixed location in the Alibi Room, a local lounge. By mid-2011, Kogi had expanded from the original truck to five.

In 2010, the creators of Kogi opened two sister restaurants serving Korean inspired food. The restaurant Chego, with a primary focus on bowls, opened on April 7, 2010. Another restaurant and full bar, The A-Frame, was created from a former IHOP and modeled around the sloped architecture; it opened on November 4, 2010.

To serve airline passengers at Terminal 4, Kogi opened a stationary location within the secured area at the Los Angeles International Airport in December 2014. What distinguished this airport terminal eatery from its competitors within the food court is that it was made to look like a Kogi food truck. In November 2015, Kogi quietly left LAX and handed the food truck in the terminal over to Border Grill, another locally owned restaurant. The change is a part of the airport's plan to have a different vendor occupy the food truck every few months.

Kogi Taqueria 
In April 2016, Kogi opened their first brick-and-mortar version of their food trucks in Palms, Los Angeles. Called Kogi Taqueria, the new operation carried all of the favorites from the food truck menu, some favorites from their Alibi Room, plus some Mexican-American standards such as carne asada, carnitas, and pollo asada. The restaurant was designed to look like a garage that houses the food trucks when they are not on the road.

Seven months later, a second Kogi Taqueria location was opened inside a Whole Foods Market in El Segundo in November 2016.

Reasons for success 
Part of the reason for the sudden and strong interest in Kogi is the food. The New York Times opined, "The food at Kogi Korean BBQ-To-Go, the taco vendor that has overtaken Los Angeles, does not fit into any known culinary category."

Los Angeles, like many large American cities, has a large percentage of residents from different cultures, and Kogi relies on the familiarity people have with other cuisines.

The attraction, however, depends only partly on the flavors. Media accounts emphasize the social aspect of eating at the ever-mobile Kogi. According to the Los Angeles Times, "The truck and its staff of merry makers have become a sort of roving party, bringing people to neighborhoods they might not normally go to, and allowing for interactions with strangers they might not otherwise talk to."

In popular culture 
Kogi was the inspiration for the title of a jazz song by artist Jacob Mann released on December 9, 2016.

See also 
 Don Chow Tacos
 List of food trucks

References

External links 
 
 Roy Choi – Kogi BBQ on KCET Departures Venice Interviews with the founder of Kogi BBQ

Food trucks
Korean cuisine
Korean-American culture in Los Angeles
Mexican-American cuisine
Mexican-American culture in Los Angeles
Restaurants in Los Angeles